Radio Stars on Parade is a 1945 American comedy film directed by Leslie Goodwins from a screenplay by Robert E. Kent and Monte Brice, from Kent's original story. Produced and distributed by RKO Radio Pictures, it was released on August 1, 1945.  The film stars the comedy team of Brown and Carney (Wally Brown and Alan Carney), along with Frances Langford.

Cast
 Wally Brown as Jerry Miles
 Alan Carney as Mike Strager
 Frances Langford as Sally
 Sheldon Leonard as Lucky
 Ralph Edwards as himself
 Don Wilson as Announcer
 Emory Parnell as Chief Inspector

References

External links

1945 films
RKO Pictures films
American black-and-white films
1945 comedy films
American comedy films
Films directed by Leslie Goodwins
1940s American films